Domna Pavlovna Komarova (18 October 1920, village Lamskoye in Yeletsky Uyezd – 31 December 1994, Moscow) was a Soviet and Russian politician.

She was a Minister of Social Affairs from 1967 to 1988.

References

1920 births
1994 deaths
20th-century Russian women politicians
People from Yeletsky Uyezd
People from Stanovlyansky District
Fifth convocation members of the Supreme Soviet of the Soviet Union
Sixth convocation members of the Supreme Soviet of the Soviet Union
Seventh convocation members of the Supreme Soviet of the Soviet Union
Members of the Supreme Soviet of the Russian Soviet Federative Socialist Republic, 1971–1975
Members of the Supreme Soviet of the Russian Soviet Federative Socialist Republic, 1975–1980
Members of the Supreme Soviet of the Russian Soviet Federative Socialist Republic, 1980–1985
Members of the Supreme Soviet of the Russian Soviet Federative Socialist Republic, 1985–1990
Recipients of the Order of Friendship of Peoples
Recipients of the Order of Lenin
Recipients of the Order of the Red Banner of Labour
Russian communists
Soviet women in politics
Burials at Kuntsevo Cemetery